This is a listing of the horses that finished in either first, second, or third place and the number of starters in the Travers Stakes, an American Grade 1 race for three-year-olds at 1-1/4 miles on dirt held at Saratoga Race Course in Saratoga Springs, New York.    

(List shows 1972–present; DH stands for dead heat, i.e., a tie)

References 

Saratoga Race Course
Graded stakes races in the United States
Flat horse races for three-year-olds
Horse races in New York (state)
Grade 1 stakes races in the United States
Recurring sporting events established in 1864